Elaine Ann Kasimatis was an American mathematician specializing in discrete geometry and mathematics education. She was a professor in the Department of Mathematics & Statistics at California State University, Sacramento.

Education and career
Kasimatis was educated at the University of California, Davis. She earned a bachelor's degree in mathematics there in 1976, and a master's degree in mathematics education in 1979. She returned to Davis for graduate study in pure mathematics, earning a second master's degree in 1983 and completing her Ph.D. in 1986. Her dissertation, Dissection of Regular Polygons into Triangles of Equal Areas, was supervised by Sherman K. Stein.

She joined the faculty at California State University, Sacramento in 1986.

Contributions
Kasimatis was known for her work on equidissection, the subdivision of polygons into triangles of equal area; with Stein, she made the first studies of equidissections of regular pentagons, and introduced the concept of the equidissection spectrum of a polygon.

She was also the author of an algebra textbook, Making Sense of Elementary Algebra: Data, Equations, and Graphs, with Cindy L. Erickson, Addison-Wesley, 1999.

Recognition
Kasimitis was one of the 2021 winners of the Deborah and Franklin Haimo Awards for Distinguished College or University Teaching of Mathematics of the Mathematical Association of America. The award cited her "major role in developing the first program in California to integrate
mathematics content with teacher preparation", her mentorship of student teachers, her development of the middle-school Access to Algebra program and the College Preparatory Mathematics program, both used nationally, and her volunteer work developing mathematics education in Rwanda.

References

20th-century American mathematicians
21st-century American mathematicians
American women mathematicians
University of California, Davis alumni
California State University, Sacramento faculty
20th-century American women
21st-century American women